Humanity is a 1933 American Pre-Code drama film directed by John Francis Dillon and written by Bradley King. The film stars Ralph Morgan, Boots Mallory, Alexander Kirkland, Irene Ware, Noel Madison and Wade Boteler. The film was released om March 3, 1933, by Fox Film Corporation.

Cast 
Ralph Morgan as Dr. William MacDonald
Boots Mallory as Nancy Moore
Alexander Kirkland as Bill MacDonald
Irene Ware as Olive Pelton
Noel Madison as Sam Bernstein 
Wade Boteler as Police Lt. Mike Farley
Christian Rub as Schmiddy
Betty Jane Graham as Rosie Schmidt
Ferike Boros as Mrs. Bernstein
George Irving as Dr. Van Buren
Crauford Kent as James Pelton
Nella Walker as Mrs. James Pelton

References

External links 
 

1933 films
Fox Film films
American drama films
1933 drama films
Films directed by John Francis Dillon
American black-and-white films
1930s English-language films
1930s American films